
Gmina Wieruszów is an urban-rural gmina (administrative district) in Wieruszów County, Łódź Voivodeship, in central Poland.

Villages
Apart from the town of Wieruszów, Gmina Wieruszów contains the villages and settlements of Chobanin, Cieszęcin, Dobrydział, Górka Wieruszowska, Grześka, Jutrków, Klatka, Kowalówka, Kuźnica Skakawska, Lubczyna, Mesznary, Mieleszynek, Mirków, Pieczyska, Polesie, Skakawa, Sopel, Teklinów and Wyszanów.

Neighbouring gminas
Gmina Wieruszów is bordered by the gminas of Baranów, Bolesławiec, Czastary, Doruchów, Galewice, Kępno, Łęka Opatowska and Sokolniki.

References
Polish official population figures 2006

Wieruszow
Wieruszów County